Itaconic acid, or methylidenesuccinic acid, is an organic compound. This dicarboxylic acid is a white solid that is soluble in water, ethanol, and acetone.  Historically, itaconic acid was obtained by the distillation of citric acid, but currently it is produced by fermentation.  The name itaconic acid was devised as an anagram of aconitic acid, another derivative of citric acid.

Production 
Since the 1960s, it is produced industrially by the fermentation of carbohydrates such as glucose or molasses using fungi such as Aspergillus itaconicus or Aspergillus terreus.

For A. terreus the itaconate pathway is mostly elucidated. The generally accepted route for itaconate is via glycolysis, tricarboxylic acid cycle, and a decarboxylation of cis-aconitate to itaconate via cis-aconitate-decarboxylase.

The smut fungus Ustilago maydis uses an alternative route. Cis-aconitate is converted to the thermodynamically favoured trans-aconitate via aconitate-Δ-isomerase (Adi1). trans-Aconitate is further decarboxylated to itaconate by trans-aconitate-decarboxylase (Tad1).

Itaconic acid is also produced in cells of macrophage lineage. It was shown that itaconate is a covalent inhibitor of the enzyme isocitrate lyase in vitro. As such, itaconate may possess antibacterial activities against bacteria expressing isocitrate lyase (such as Salmonella enterica and Mycobacterium tuberculosis).

However, cells of macrophage lineage have to "pay the price" for making itaconate, and they lose the ability to perform mitochondrial substrate-level phosphorylation.

Laboratory synthesis
Dry distillation of citric acid affords itaconic anhydride, which undergoes hydrolysis to itaconic acid.

Reactions
Upon heating, itaconic anhydride isomerizes to citraconic acid anhydride, which can be hydrolyzed to citraconic acid (2-methylmaleic acid).

Partial hydrogenation of itaconic acid over Raney nickel affords 2-methylsuccinic acid.

Itaconic acid is primarily used as a co-monomer in the production of acrylonitrile butadiene styrene and acrylate latexes with applications in the paper and architectural coating industry.

References 

Enoic acids
Dicarboxylic acids
Monomers
Vinylidene compounds